Abby's Ultimate Dance Competition was an American dance reality competition series on Lifetime. The series encompasses twelve talented boy and girl dancers who are competing for $100,000 and a scholarship to the prestigious Joffrey Ballet Academy. The show is hosted by Kevin Manno, and judged by Abby Lee Miller, Richy Jackson, and Robin Antin. Season 2 premiered on September 3, 2013, with Rachelle Rak replacing Robin Antin in the judging panel.

Season 1 Cast

Dancers
 Brianna Haire, a lyrical/jazz dancer from Temecula, California. She became the first winner of Abby's Ultimate Dance Competition, winning the $100,000 and the scholarship to the young dancers program at the Joffrey Ballet School in New York.
 Madison O'Connor, a lyrical/jazz dancer from Boca Raton, Florida. She was the runner-up of the competition.
 Asia Monet Ray, a jazz/contemporary dancer and singer from Corona, California. She was placed 3rd in the competition, and was beaten by Madison and Brianna. Asia later joined Dance Moms briefly in season three, dancing with the Junior Elite Competition Team at the Abby Lee Dance Company (ALDC) and left just before Nationals.
 Amanda Carbajales, a lyrical/jazz dancer from Miami, Florida. She placed in 4th in the competition.
 Jordyn Jones, a hip-hop/contemporary dancer from Three Rivers, Michigan. During a flexibility test, she was successful in the test until she pulled a muscle, which lead to her being sent home and placing her 5th in the competition. 
 Hadley Walts, a jazz dancer from Evansville, Indiana. She was placed 6th in the competition. Hadley later appeared on Dance Moms to be a guest dancer for the Candy Apples Dance Center (CADC) in seasons three and four.
 Lexine Cantoria, a jazz/contemporary dancer from Norco, California. She was placed 7th in the competition.
 Elisabeth Tracy, a lyrical/contemporary dancer from Coto de Caza, California. She was placed 8th in the competition.
 Lennon Torres (appeared as Zack Torres), a lyrical/jazz dancer from Phoenix, Arizona. She  placed 9th in the competition. Lennon later appeared on Dance Moms to be a guest dancer for the CADC in seasons three, four, and seven. She was the first Abby's Ultimate Dance Competition cast member to join Dance Moms.
 Tua Tevaga, a lyrical/jazz funk dancer from Daytona Beach, Florida. She placed 10th in the competition.
 Kyleigh Jai Colchico-Greeley, a lyrical/jazz dancer from Pittsburg, California. She was placed 11th in the competition.
 Tessa Wilkinson, a lyrical/contemporary dancer from Scottsdale, Arizona. She was placed 12th in the competition. Tessa later appeared on Dance Moms to be a guest dancer for the CADC in season five as well as a guest for JC's Broadway Dance Academy in seasons five and six.
 Amanda Kelly, a lyrical/musical theatre dancer from Rochester Hills, Michigan. She was placed 13th in the competition.
 Nicole Yu, a jazz dancer from San Jose, California. She was the first sent home, placing her 14th.

Moms
 Kris Haire, mother of Brianna.
 Coreen O'Connor, mother of Madison.
 Kristie Ray, mother of Asia.
 Mayelin Carbajales, mother of Amanda C.
 Kelly Jones, mother of Jordyn.
 Yvette Walts, mother of Hadley.
 Maria Cantoria, mother of Lexine.
 Erin Tracy, mother of Elisabeth.
 Gina Torres, mother of Lennon.
 Shayna Tevaga, mother of Tua.
 Kristen Colchico-Greeley, mother of Kyleigh.
 Renée Wilkinson, mother of Tessa.
 Michelle Kelly, mother of Amanda K.
 Sabrina Jackson, mother of Nicole.

Season 2 Cast

Dancers
 McKaylee True, a lyrical/contemporary dancer from Lincoln, Nebraska. She became the second winner of Abby's Ultimate Dance Competition.
 Gianna Newborg, a lyrical/jazz dancer from Yardley, Pennsylvania. She was the runner-up of the competition.
 Trinity Inay, a jazz/hip-hop dancer from Seattle, Washington. She was placed 3rd in the competition, and was beaten by Gianna and McKaylee.
 Kalani Hilliker, a lyrical/contemporary dancer from Mesa, Arizona. She was placed 4th in the competition. Kalani was brought to the ALDC during season four on Dance Moms to replace Brooke and Paige Hyland. After several weeks with the ALDC team in season four, she was made into a permanent team member in season five. Kalani left the ALDC during season seven to form "The Irreplaceables" with several other elite team members, and left the show entirely following the season finale.
 JoJo Siwa, a jazz/hip-hop dancer from Omaha, Nebraska. She was placed 5th in the competition. JoJo was brought to the ALDC during season five on Dance Moms to replace Chloe Lukasiak. After several episodes as a guest dancer, she was made into a permanent team member, but left the show near the end of season six after signing a contract with Nickelodeon. JoJo also made a guest appearance on Dance Moms in season eight and in the season finale of season 7

 Travis Atwood, a hip-hop/contemporary dancer from Jamestown, Rhode Island. He was placed 6th in the competition.
 Ally Robinson, a hip-hop/jazz funk dancer from Yorba Linda, California. She was placed 7th in the competition.
 Tyler Atwood, a hip-hop dancer from Jamestown and Travis' identical twin brother. He was placed 8th in the competition.
 Haley Huelsman, a lyrical/musical theatre dancer from Madison, Connecticut. She was placed 9th in the competition. Haley later appeared on Dance Moms as a guest dancer for the CADC during seasons five and seven.
 Chloe Beatty, a contemporary ballet/lyrical/jazz funk dancer from Winston-Salem, North Carolina. She was placed 10th in the competition.
 Sarina Jassy, a lyrical/jazz dancer from San Diego. She was the first sent home, placing her 11th.

Moms
 Shari True, mother of McKaylee.
 Cindy Passanante-Walton, mother of Gianna.
 Tina Inay, mother of Trinity.
 Kira Girard, mother of Kalani.
 Jessalynn Siwa, mother of JoJo.
 Sheryl Atwood, mother of Travis and Tyler.
 Tiffany Robinson, mother of Ally.
 Melanie Huelsman, mother of Haley.
 Angela Beatty, mother of Chloe.
 Sharon Jassy, mother of Sarina.

Episodes

Season 1 (2012)

Season 2 (2013)

Progress table
A recap of both seasons.

Season 1 (2012)

 The dancer won Abby's Ultimate Dance Competition.
 The dancer came in second place in Abby's Ultimate Dance Competition.
 The dancer came in third place in Abby's Ultimate Dance Competition.
 The dancer had one of the best performances of the evening based on the judges decision and advanced.
 The dancer advanced to the next episode without being in the bottom or being one of the top performers.
 The dancer finished in the bottom five/four and advanced.
 The dancer finished in the bottom three and advanced.
 The dancer finished in the bottom two and advanced.
 The dancer was eliminated from Abby's Ultimate Dance Competition.
 The dancer was eliminated in a previous episode and is no longer competing.

Season 2 (2013)  

 The dancer won Abby's Ultimate Dance Competition.
 The dancer came in second place in Abby's Ultimate Dance Competition.
 The dancer came in third place in Abby's Ultimate Dance Competition.
 The dancer had one of the best performances of the evening based on the judges decision and advanced.
 The dancer had immunity from the elimination.
 The dancer advanced to the next episode without being in the bottom three or being one of the top performers.
 The dancer finished in the bottom five/four and advanced.
 The dancer finished in the bottom three and advanced.
 The dancer finished in the bottom two and advanced.
 The dancer was eliminated but was saved by one of the judges by using their Call Back Card.
 The dancer was eliminated from Abby's Ultimate Dance Competition.
 The dancer was eliminated in a previous episode and is no longer competing.
 The dancer is male.

References

External links
 

2010s American reality television series
2012 American television series debuts
2013 American television series endings
American television spin-offs
English-language television shows
Lifetime (TV network) original programming
Dance competition television shows
Dance Moms
Reality television spin-offs
Television series about children
Television series about teenagers